Crocanthes pancala is a moth in the family Lecithoceridae. It was described by Turner in 1919. It is found in Australia, where it has been recorded from Queensland.

The forewings are pale-yellow partly suffused with deeper yellow and with fuscous markings. There is an inwardly oblique narrow fascia from the costa near the base to the base of the dorsum and a second similar parallel fascia shortly beyond this. There is also a short line or transverse discal mark before the middle and a third fascia at two-thirds, as well as a fourth subterminal, the latter ill-defined anteriorly. There is also a broad terminal line. The hindwings are whitish partly suffused with yellow and with a basal fuscous patch and a yellow dot edged with fuscous in the disc at one-third, as well as a median transverse fuscous fascia enclosing two yellow dots. An irregular subterminal fascia and a terminal line are both fuscous.

References

Moths described in 1919
Crocanthes